The Sovereign Military Order of Malta (SMOM) is a sovereign entity maintaining diplomatic relations with 112 sovereign states (including the Holy See). Additionally, it has observer status or representation at multiple intergovernmental organisations. The Order has non-diplomatic official relations with five more states: France, Belgium, Switzerland, Luxembourg and Canada. The Order exchanges ambassadors with the European Union and the State of Palestine.

Some states recognize SMOM as a sovereign state, rather than a sovereign subject of international law. For example, the Republic of San Marino in 1939 recognized SMOM as a sovereign state in its own right. As Italy recognizes, in addition to extraterritoriality, the exercise by SMOM of all the prerogatives of sovereignty in its headquarters, Italian sovereignty and SMOM sovereignty uniquely coexist without overlapping.

As of June 2010, nine Schengen states did not recognize the diplomatic passports of the Order: Belgium, Netherlands, Luxembourg, Greece, France, Finland, Sweden, Iceland, and Switzerland.

Bilateral relations

Diplomatic relations

Official relations

Unofficial relations
The Order of Malta has unofficial relations with Taiwan through the Embassy of the Republic of China to the Holy See in Rome (Italy).

Countries without established relations
Countries with which the Order currently has no established relations:
 Europe: Andorra, Denmark, Finland, Ireland, Netherlands (recognises as a knightly order), Norway, Sweden, United Kingdom
 Africa: Algeria, Botswana, Burundi, Djibouti, Eswatini, Gambia, Ghana, Libya, Malawi, Nigeria, Rwanda, South Africa, Tanzania, Uganda, Zambia, Zimbabwe
 Asia: Azerbaijan, Bahrain, Bangladesh, Bhutan, Brunei, Indonesia, India, Iran, Iraq, Israel, Japan, Kuwait, Kyrgyzstan, Laos, Malaysia, Maldives, Mongolia (accepts its stamps), Myanmar, Nepal, North Korea, Oman, Pakistan, People's Republic of China, Qatar, Saudi Arabia, Singapore, South Korea, Sri Lanka, Syria, Taiwan, Turkey, Tunisia, United Arab Emirates, Uzbekistan, Vietnam, Yemen
 Oceania: Australia, Cook Islands, Fiji, New Zealand, Niue, Palau, Papua New Guinea, Samoa, Solomon Islands, Tonga, Tuvalu, Vanuatu
 The Americas:  Barbados, Dominica, Jamaica, Mexico, Saint Kitts and Nevis, Trinidad and Tobago, United States of America

Intergovernmental organizations
The Order of Malta has observer status at the following organizations:

The Order of Malta has delegations or representations to the following organizations:

See also
 List of diplomatic missions of the Sovereign Military Order of Malta
 List of diplomatic missions to the Sovereign Military Order of Malta
 List of Permanent Observers of the Sovereign Military Order of Malta to the United Nations
 Accreditations and diplomatic relations of the Sovereign Military Order of Malta

References